Mukachevo (see name section) is a city in the valley of the Latorica river in Zakarpattia Oblast (province), in Western Ukraine. Serving as the administrative center of Mukachevo Raion (district), the city itself does not belong to the raion and is designated as a city of oblast significance, with the status equal to that of a separate raion. The city is a rail terminus and highway junction, and has beer, wine, tobacco, food, textile, timber, and furniture industries. During the Cold War, it was home to Mukachevo air base and a radar station.

Mukachevo lies close to the borders of four neighbouring countries: Poland, Slovakia, Hungary, and Romania. The city is a traditional stronghold of the Rusyn language, and the population of Mukachevo is officially reported as 77.1% ethnic Ukrainian. There are also significant minorities of: Russians (9.0%); Hungarians (8.5%); Germans (1.9%); and Roma (1.4%).

Up until World War II and the Holocaust, Mukachevo was primarily a Jewish town, and half the population was Jewish (see below), the rest of the population being Russians, Hungarian, Slovak, and other minorities. Formerly in Czechoslovakia, and before that in Hungary, it was incorporated into Soviet Ukraine after World War II.

Name
Most probably, the name derived from the Hungarian surname "Muncas" - munkás (worker) which later transformed into Munkács, while  another version points that the name contains proto-Slavic root "Muka" which means (flour).

On 23 May 2017 the Ukrainian parliament officially renamed Mukacheve (Мукачеве) into Mukachevo (Мукачево), a year after the city council had decided to rename the city. Previously, it was usually spelled in Standard Literary Ukrainian as Mukacheve while Мукачів (Mukachiv) was sometimes also used. The city's name in Russian is Мукачево (Mukachevo), which is also the Russian transliteration as well as a name adopted by the local authorities and portrayed on the city's coat of arms.

History

Early history
Archaeological excavation suggest that early settlements existed here before the Middle Ages. For example, a Celtic oppidum and metal works center that existed in the 3rd-1st century BC were found between the Halish and Lovachka mountains. A Thracian fort of the Iron Age (10th century BC) was found on the mountain of Tupcha. Around the 1st century the area was occupied by the Carpi people who displaced the local Celts from the area. The Slavs settled the territory in the 6th century.

Hungarian rule

In 1397, the town and its surrounding was granted by Sigismund, Holy Roman Emperor, to his distant cousin, the exiled prince of Grand Duchy of Lithuania Fyodor Koriatovych, who used to administrate the Ruthenian Podolia region of the Grand Duchy of Lithuania, until was exiled for disobedience by Grand Duke Vytautas the Great in 1392. Theodor therefore became a vassal of Hungary and settled many Ruthenians in the territory. Other sources, however, state that Theodor bought the town and the surrounding area in 1396. During the 15th century, the city prospered and became a prominent craft and trade center for the region. In 1445, the town became a Hungarian royal free city. It was also granted Magdeburg rights.

During the 16th century, Munkács became part of the Principality of Transylvania. The 17th century (from 1604 to 1711) was a time of continuous struggle against the expansionist intentions of the Habsburg Empire for the Principality. In 1678 the anti-Habsburg Revolt of Emeric Thököly started out from Munkács. The region also played an important role in Rákóczi's War of Independence.

Austrian control and revolts

After the defeat of Francis II Rákóczi the city came under Austrian control in the mid-18th century as part of the Kingdom of Hungary and was made a key fortress of the Habsburg monarchy. In 1726, the Palanok Castle and the town, before 1711 owned by the Rákóczi family, was given by the Habsburgs to the Schönborn family, who were responsible for an expansion of the town. They also settled many Germans in the territory, thereby causing an economic boom of the region. During 1796–1897, the city's castle, until then a strong fortress, became a prison. The Greek national hero Alexander Ypsilanti was imprisoned at the Palanok Castle between 1821 and 1823.

Mukachevo during and after the wars

In 1919, after the Rusyn Americans agreed with Tomáš Masaryk on incorporating Carpathian Ruthenia into Czechoslovakia, the whole of Carpathian Ruthenia was occupied by Czechoslovak troops.  On June 4, 1920,  Mukachevo officially became part of Czechoslovakia through the Treaty of Trianon.  In November 1938, a part of the territory of the former Kingdom of Hungary was re-annexed by Hungary as part of the First Vienna Award.

Without delay the new authorities decreed the expulsion of all the Jews without Hungarian citizenship. As a consequence Polish and Russian Jews, long-term residents of the now Hungarian-controlled Transcarpathian region, and also from Mukachevo, as well as the native Jews who could not prove their citizenship, were deported over the Ukrainian border where they were turned over to the German Einsatzgruppe commando led by Friedrich Jeckeln. On August 27 and 28 1941 they were all murdered by the Germans in Kamianets-Podilskyi's massacre. Even so, Mukachevo's population still held an important Jewish component, until in 1944 all the Jews were deported to the Auschwitz concentration camp by Adolf Eichmann.

In the end of 1944, the Red Army stormed Carpathian Ruthenia. At first the territory was given to the reestablished Czechoslovakia, then became part of the Soviet Union by a treaty between the two countries, later in 1945. The Soviet Union began a policy of expulsion of the Hungarian population. In 1945, the city was ceded to the Ukrainian Soviet Socialist Republic, and is now in Ukraine. Since 2002, Mukachevo has been the seat of the Roman Catholic Diocese of Mukachevo.

The 128th Mountain Assault Brigade of the Ukrainian Ground Forces has been based in Mukachevo since after World War II.

Sport
The main soccer team is MFA Mukachevo, which play in Ukrainian Second League.

Climate
Mukachevo has a humid continental climate (Köppen: Dfb).

Demographics
 
In 1921, 21,000 people lived in Mukachevo. Of these,  48 percent were Jews, 24 percent were Rusyns, and 22 percent were Hungarians.

The city's population in 1966 was 50,500. Of these, 60% were Ukrainians, 18 percent Hungarians, 10% Russians and 6% Jews.

According to the 2001 census, 82,200 people live in Mukachevo. The population in 1989 was 91,000, in 2004 77,300 and in 2008 93,738. Its population includes:
Ukrainians (77.1%)
Russians (9.0%)
Hungarians (8.5%)
Germans (1.9%)
Roma (1.4%)
Ashkenazi & Sephardic Jews (1.1%)

Residents in seven villages of the Mukachevo Raion have the option to learn the Hungarian language in a school or home school environment.

Economy

Fischer Sports, an Austrian company that produces Nordic skiing, alpine skiing, and ice hockey equipment, has a factory in Mukachevo. The firm benefits from provisional application on January 1, 2016 of the Deep and Comprehensive Free Trade Area provisions of the European Union–Ukraine Association Agreement.

Jewish community
See also Munkacs (Hasidic dynasty)

There are documents in the Berehove (Beregszász) State Archives which indicate that Ashkenazi Jews lived in Munkács and the surrounding villages as early as the second half of the seventeenth century. The Jewish community of Munkács was an amalgam of Galician and Hungarian Hasidic Jewry, Orthodox Jews, and Zionists. The town is most noted for its Chief Rabbi Chaim Elazar Spira who led the community until his death in 1937.

By 1851, Munkács supported a large yeshiva, thereby demonstrating the community's commitment to Talmudic learning and piety.

Materially impoverished, yet wealthy in ideological debate, the Jews of interwar Munkács constituted almost half of the town's population. The Munkács Jewish community was famous for its Hasidic activity as well as its innovations in Zionism and modern Jewish education.

The Jewish population of Munkács grew from 2,131 in 1825 to 5049 in 1891 (almost 50 percent of the total population) to 7675 in 1910 (about 44 percent). By 1921, the 10,000 Jews still made up about half the residents, though by 1930, the proportion had dropped to 43 percent, with a little over 11,000 Jews. The Jews of Munkács constituted 11 percent of the Jewry of Subcarpathian Rus'.

Interwar Munkács had a very large Jewish population, which was most visible on Shabbat. On that day most stores were closed and, after services, the streets filled with Hasidic Jews in their traditional garb. The first movie house in the town was established by a Hasidic Jew, and it too closed on the Shabbat and Jewish holidays.

The Chief Rabbi of Munkács, Chaim Elazar Spira (who led the community from 1913 until his death in 1937) was the most outspoken voice of religious anti-Zionism. He had succeeded his father, Rabbi Zvi Hirsh Spira, who had earlier inherited the mantle of leadership from his father Rabbi Shlomo Spira. He was also a Hasidic rebbe with a significant number of followers. Rabbi Chaim Elazar Spira was succeeded by his son-in-law, Rabbi Baruch Yehoshua Yerachmiel Rabinowicz.

Along with the dominant Munkácser hasidic community there co-existed smaller yet vibrant Hasidic groups who were followers of the rebbes  Belz, of Spinka, Zidichov, and Vizhnitz. By the time of the Holocaust there were nearly 30 synagogues in town, many of which were shtibelekh ("[small] house" - small [Hasidic] synagogues).

The Hebrew Gymnasium (high school) was founded in Munkács five years after the first Hebrew speaking elementary school in Czechoslovakia was established there in 1920. It soon became the most prestigious Hebrew high school east of Warsaw. Zionist activism along with Hasidic pietism contributed to a community percolating with excitement, intrigue and at times internecine conflict.

In 1935, Chaim Kugel, formerly director of the Munkács gymnasium (Jewish high school) and then Jewish Party delegate to the Czechoslovak Parliament, gave a speech during a parliamentary debate: "…It is completely impossible to adequately describe the poverty in the area. The Jews… are affected equally along with the rest…. I strongly wish to protest any attempt to blame the poverty of the Subcarpathian Ruthenian peasantry on the Jews"  (Kugel later got to Mandatory Palestine and eventually became mayor of the Israeli city of Holon).

Government policies were covertly directed against Jews, who bore a heavy share of taxes and had difficulty getting high civil service positions.

In 1939, the Hungarians seized and annexed Subcarpathian Rus—including Munkács—taking advantage of the dismemberment of Czechoslovakia. Though antisemitic legislation was introduced by the Hungarian authorities, Subcarpathian Rus, like the rest of Hungary, remained a relative haven for Jews until Nazi Germany occupied Hungary in 1944.

In the spring of 1944 there were nearly 15,000 Jewish residents of the town. This ended on May 30, 1944 when the city was pronounced Judenrein (free of Jews after ghettoization and a series of deportations to Auschwitz).

Today, Mukachevo is experiencing a Jewish renaissance of sorts with the establishment of a supervised kosher kitchen, a mikveh, Jewish summer camp in addition to the prayer services which take place three times daily. In July 2006, a new synagogue was dedicated on the site of a pre-war hasidic synagogue.

Architectural landmarks
Palanok Castle, 14th century. The castle of Munkács played an important role during the anti-Habsburg revolts in this territory and present-day Slovakia (1604–1711), especially at the beginning of the anti-Habsburg Revolt of Imre Thököly (1685–1688), as well as at the beginning of the revolt of Ferenc II. Rákóczi (early 18th century). This important fortress became a prison from the end of the 18th century and was used until 1897. The Greek national hero Alexander Ypsilanti was imprisoned in Munkács castle from 1821 to 1823.
Saint Nicholas Monastery
Wooden church built in the Ukrainian architectural style, 18th century

Notable people

Lojza Baránek
Samuel Gottesman
Helena Kahan Jockel Helena Jockel (1919-), Memoir: We Sang in Hushed Voices (Azrieli Series of Holocaust Survivor Memoirs; VI), 2014.
Ihor Kharatin
Fyodor Koriatovych
Lolita Milyavskaya
Ivan Mozer
Mihály Munkácsy
Rio Preisner
Baruch Yehoshua Yerachmiel Rabinowicz
Moshe Leib Rabinovich
Ludvík Ráža
Ján Strausz
Svyatoslav Vakarchuk
Yitzchok Yaakov Weiss
Joseph Meir Weiss
Yuri Yukechev
Naomi Blake
Irina Galay
Ilona Zrinyi
Dmytro Yeblusha

Twin towns – sister cities

Mukachevo is twinned with: 

 Celldömölk, Hungary
 Dabas, Hungary
 Eger, Hungary
 Humenné, Slovakia
 Kisvárda, Hungary
 Mátészalka, Hungary
 Nyírmeggyes, Hungary
 Mielec, Poland
 Pag, Croatia
 Pelhřimov, Czech Republic
 Prešov, Slovakia
 Senta, Serbia

 Várkerület (Budapest), Hungary

Gallery

See also
Zakarpattia Oblast
Eparchy of Mukachevo and Prešov
Saint Nicholas Monastery (Mukachevo)
Byzantine Catholic Eparchy of Mukachevo
Roman Catholic Diocese of Mukachevo

References

Further reading

The History of Cities and Villages of the Ukrainian SSR of the National Academy of Sciences of Ukraine

External links

Mukachevo City Council - Mukachevo City Council website
mukachevo.net – Mukachevo city portal
Newspaper "Mukachivsjka Ratusha" Official news Mukachevo Mayor
Mukachevo News, Panorama Mukachevo - http://panorama-mukachevo.com
Mukachevo, Ukraine (Munkács, HU) ShtetLink on JewishGen.org
The Palanok Castle - Pictures of the Palanok castle and view on Mukachevo from Sergey Sorokin - a private mountain guide
Mukachiv in the Encyclopedia of Ukraine
United States Holocaust Memorial Museum Jewish Community of Munkacs
A Jewish Community in the Carpathian Mountains- The Story of Munkács - Yad Vashem
A Film of Jewish Life in Munkacs 
security agency "schit" 
Mukachevo Survey City tour
Mukacheve - ShtetLink
Mukacheve Mukachevo, historical information, archival and contemporary photos, landmarks 

 
Cities in Zakarpattia Oblast
Shtetls
Cities of regional significance in Ukraine
Holocaust locations in Ukraine